The Badminton Game is a 1973 painting by the English painter David Inshaw. It was inspired by the gardens of Devizes and the landscape of Wiltshire. Inshaw has described how the place gave him a feeling of "mystery and wonder". He wrote about the painting: "my main aim was to produce a picture that held a moment in time, but unlike a photograph, which only records an event. I thought a painting could give a more universal, deeper meaning to that moment by composing one instant from lots of different unrelated moments." Its original title was a line from Thomas Hardy's poem "She, to Him": Remembering mine the loss is, not the blame.

The painting was exhibited at the ICA Summer Studio exhibition in London. It is in the collection of the Tate Gallery since 1980. According to The Guardian, it is "one of the most enduringly popular images in the museum's collection". As of 2017, it was not on display.

In 2011 it was the subject of an episode in BBC's series Hidden Paintings of the West.

References

External links
 About the painting at the artist's website

1973 paintings
Brotherhood of Ruralists
Collection of the Tate galleries
Culture in Wiltshire
Devizes
English paintings